"Memeshikute" (女々しくて, It's feminine) is the fourth single of Golden Bomber and released on October 21, 2009. It also released as a double A-side single as "Memeshikute/Nemutakute" (女々しくて/眠たくて) on August 24, 2011.

Abstract
The song was used as advertisement song of Softband Mobile, collaborated with Atsuko Maeda.

It had performed 5 times in Kōhaku Uta Gassen.

It broke the record of consecutive weekly No.2 on Oricon Karaoke Chart by AKB48.

Track listing
Memeshikute 
  'Memeshikute' 
  'Cool English' 
  'While you are not' 
  'Wonderful (Original Karaoke)' 
  'Cool English (Original Karaoke)' 
  'In the absence of you (original karaoke)' 

Memeshikute/Nemutakute
  'It's feminine'  [4:09]
  'I want to sleep'  [3:55]
  'Femdom -Korean version-'  [4:09]
  'I can't sleep tonight (in a pathological sense)'  [3:38]
 Feminine (original karaoke) [4:09]
 I want to sleep (original karaoke) [3:55]
 Feminine -Korean POP Version- (Original Karaoke) [4:09]
 Can't sleep tonight (in a pathological sense) (original karaoke) [3:38]

Chart
Oricon

References

Golden Bomber songs
2009 singles